Raimondi is an Italian surname. Notable people with the surname include:

Aldo Raimondi (1902–1997), Italian painter
Andrea Raimondi (born 1990), Italian footballer
Antonio Raimondi (1824–1890), Italian-born Peruvian geographer and natural historian
Ben Raimondi (born 1925), American football player
Billy Raimondi (1912–2010), American baseball player
Carlo Raimondi (1809–1883), Italian engraver and painter
Cristian Raimondi (born 1981), Italian footballer
Diego Raimondi (born 1977), Argentine footballer
Edoardo Raimondi (1837–1919), Italian painter
Elvira Raimondi (1866–1920), Italian painter
Elviro Raimondi, Italian painter
Franca Raimondi (1932–1988), Italian pop singer
Giancarlo Raimondi (born 1972), Italian cyclist
Gianni Raimondi (1923–2008), Italian operatic tenor
Guido Raimondi (born 1953), Italian judge
Ildikó Raimondi (born 1962), Hungarian-Austrian operatic soprano
Jessica Raimondi (born 1999), Italian professional racing cyclist
John Raimondi (born 1948), American sculptor
Leopoldo Raimondi (born 1938), Italian footballer
Luigi Raimondi (1912–1975), Italian Roman Catholic cardinal
Marcantonio Raimondi (1480–1534), Italian engraver and printmaker
Mario Raimondi (born 1980), Swiss footballer
Nicolás Raimondi (born 1984), Uruguayan footballer
Pietro Raimondi (1786–1853), Italian composer of sacred music and operas
Ruggero Raimondi (born 1941), Italian bass-baritone operatic singer and actor
Sergio Raimondi (born 1968), Argentine poet
Stefano Raimondi (born 1998), Italian swimmer
Timoleon Raimondi (1827–1894), Italian-born Roman Catholic Prefect and Vicar Apostolic of Hong Kong

Italian-language surnames
Patronymic surnames
Surnames from given names